The Stroh violin or  Stroviol is a type of stringed musical instrument that is mechanically amplified by a metal resonator and horn attached to its body. The name Stroviol refers to a violin, but other instruments have been modified with the amplification device, including the viola, cello, double bass, ukulele, mandolin, and guitar. John Matthias Augustus Stroh, an electrical engineer in London, invented the instrument in 1899.

Description

The Stroh violin has a horn at the end of the fingerboard to project the sound to an audience or recording horn, and often a smaller monitoring horn that the performer placed at their ear to hear what was being played more distinctly.

The Stroh violin is much louder than a standard wooden violin, and its directional projection of sound made it particularly useful in the early days of phonographic recording. Wooden violins recorded poorly with the early acoustic-mechanical recording method, and the Stroh violin improved this by producing a fuller, louder sound.

Stroh violins were common in recording studios, but became rarer after record companies switched to the new electric microphone recording technology in the second half of the 1920s.

Invention

On 4 May 1899, Stroh applied for a UK patent, GB9418 titled Improvements in Violins and other Stringed Instruments which was accepted on 24 March 1900. This described the use of a flat metal (other materials are also mentioned) diaphragm in the voice-box (reproducer) of a violin to mechanically amplify the sound. On 16 February 1901 he applied for a second UK patent, GB3393 titled Improvements in the Diaphragms of Phonographs, Musical Instruments, and analogous Sound-producing, Recording and Transmitting Contrivances which was accepted on 14 December 1901. This effectively extended the first concept to now use a conical resonator with corrugations at its edge, allowing a more 'rigid' diaphragm. His failure to register his inventions in the USA allowed John Dopyera and Geo Beauchamp to subsequently obtain US patents for the tricone and single cone designs used in National brand instruments.

Usage

The Stroh violin was an expensive instrument: in 1911 it was offered by the London dealers Barnes & Mullins for nine guineas (£9.45, then equal to $37.80) or twelve guineas (£12.60/$50.40) at a time when a reasonable factory violin could be had for two guineas. It was listed as being especially suitable for use in small theaters and music-halls.

In 1920s Buenos Aires, Julio de Caro, a renowned Tango orchestra director and violinist, used the Stroh violin in his live performances, and was called violín-corneta (cornet violin) by the locals.

A number of musicians, including Tom Waits, Carla Kihlstedt, Thomas Newman, Bat for Lashes, A Hawk and a Hacksaw and Eric Gorfain continue to use the Stroh violin for its distinctive sound. Shakira featured a Stroh violin on her 2010/11 The Sun Comes Out World Tour, with multi-instrumentalist Una Palliser playing it on some songs. Palliser also played Stroh violin on a Tom Hickox album and live with Bitter Ruin. Pinky Weitzman plays the Stroh violin for various New York experimental ensembles, including her own project (Not Waving but Drowning), as well as Flare, LD & the New Criticism, and as part of the onstage ensemble for Stephin Merritt's My Life as a Fairy Tale. A Stroh violin is regularly played by Andy Stein of Vince Giordano's Nighthawks Orchestra. They Might Be Giants used a Stroh violin in their song "I Can Hear You", recorded on a wax cylinder at the Edison Laboratory.

The composer Mauricio Kagel uses reconstructed Stroh violin, viola, cello and double-bass in his work 1898 composed 1972-1973. Kagel found a photograph dated 1910 of a small instrumental group in a recording studio which includes three Stroh violins. Intrigued by the instrument he set out to find an example. He made a copy of the pictured instrument in collaboration with the Darmstadt violin maker, Franz-Ernst Peschke adapting the pick-up system so that the bodies of existing violins could be used as a base. In 1973 he was given a Stroh cello by Karl Schlamminger which he had bought from a Baghdad music dealer in 1920. Other conventional instruments are used in the work as well as a choir of children's voices.

Similar designs
Other makers created similar designs, such as Howson, which made brass-horned phono instruments including single-stringed phonofiddles and four-stringed phono ukuleles. The violinophone was made in Prague in the early 20th century. This instrument has a diaphragm mounted vertically in a violin body under the bridge. The sound is carried through a tube to the horn which protrudes from the violin to a long horn which wraps around the shoulder.  —a violin that amplifies its sound through a metal resonator and metal horns rather than a wooden sound box as on a standard violin.

Willy Tiebel in Markneukirchen, Germany made Stroh violin copies in the 1920s.

The Stroh violin is closely related to other horned violins using a mica sheet-resonating diaphragm, known as phonofiddles.

In the present day, many types of horn-violin exist, especially in the Balkans.

Romanian horn-violin 
The Romanian horn-violin is similar to the Stroh violin. It was built through the 20th century. It has the same length as the Stroh violin, but its horn is narrower and yields a more directional sound. The structure of the instrument is based on the tungsten element of a gramophone. Amateurs or small workshops could easily build it and, perhaps for that reason, many variants exist in Eastern Europe.

The vibrations of the strings and bridge are transmitted by a thin rod to the membrane of the gramophone-element. The membrane transforms these vibrations into sound waves, which are amplified by the horn or beaker.
The horn-violin is harder to play than a normal violin because the reaction of the bow on the strings is less flexible, and the instrument's weight is less evenly distributed. This causes an imbalance on the shoulder.

The instrument is still used in Romanian folk-music for playing horas and doinas, and mixes well with the characteristic sound of the pan-flute. It is generally used sparsely due to its tone. Instruments like the Stroh violin and other types of horn-violin remain a curiosity; they are quite rare in the orchestra.

The horn-violin is especially used in folk music of the Bihor region of Romania. Famous practitioners of this music style include fiddler Gheorghe Rada, singers Florica Bradu, Florica Ungur, Florica Duma, Leontin Ciucur, Cornel Borza, Vasile Iova, Maria Haiduc, Viorica Flintașu, and renowned folk ensembles Crișana or Rapsozii Zarandului.

See also
 Fiddle
 Hardanger fiddle
 Kontra
 Låtfiol
 Phonofiddle
 Rabeca

References

External links

 Delta Violin—Article considering the context of Stroh and other related Horn Violins
 YouTube Video—Louise played on the Stroh Fiddle (Violin) by Corwin Zekley
 Video Siperkov plays the horn-violin
 Historic Vitaphone Recording—Jazzmania Quintet, with Georgie Stoll on Stroh violin, playing "I Ain't Got Nobody"
 The violinophone is one of the interesting Instruments of Amazonas
 Recording of Piazolla's Tango "Oblivion" using both a violinophone in combination with ordinary stringed instruments.
 Antique Stroh violin Nr. 722 by Armin Sternberg, Budapest, approx. 1910
 Mauricio Kagel – 1898 (1973, Vinyl) A recording of 1898 by Mauricio Kagel which uses a Stroh violin, viola, cello and double-bass specially built and adapted in collaboration with the composer by violin maker, Franz-Ernest Peschke.
 Pamela's Music. Photographs of period instruments.

Articles containing video clips
Romanian musical instruments
Violins